Gershon Rorich (born October 23, 1973, in Cape Town, Western Cape) is a South African beach volleyball player.

Rorich competed at the FIVB Beach Volleyball World Tour between 1995 and 2008. In 2004 he qualified to the Summer Olympics, in Athens, with Colin Pocock. They won two matches in the group stage and advanced to the knockout stage, but they lost against the Australians Julien Prosser and Mark Williams in the round of 16.

References

External links
 
 
 
 

South African beach volleyball players
Living people
Olympic beach volleyball players of South Africa
Beach volleyball players at the 2004 Summer Olympics
Sportspeople from Cape Town
1973 births